Kelfala Marah (born July 7, 1984) is a Sierra Leonian international footballer.

Club career
Marah arrived in Europe in the summer of 2003 after playing with Mighty Blackpool F.C., East End Lions F.C. and FC Kallon. In September 2002 he was priced as the most expensive player in the Sierra Leone National Premier League. He first came to Sarajevo where he signed FK Željezničar Sarajevo in the Premier League of Bosnia and Herzegovina but was loaned to another Bosnian club, NK Bosna Visoko playing with them in the first half of the second level, the 2003–04 First League of the Federation of Bosnia and Herzegovina season. During winter-break, he moved to Belgrade where he played in the First League of Serbia and Montenegro club FK Čukarički. The following winter break, he was loaned to a third-level Serbian League East club FK Rudar Kostolac to get more chances to play. Next season he moved to Sweden to play with Reymersholms IK.  He would later also play with Swedish clubs Älvsjö AIK and Danderyds SK, and in 2021 Danderyds United FC in the Swedish 9th tier.

International career
Marah was part of the Sierra Leone national football team since the 2002 World Cup qualifiers.

Honors
Mighty Blackpool
Sierra Leone National Premier League: 2000, 2001
Sierra Leonean FA Cup: 2000

Čukarički
Second League of Serbia and Montenegro: 2003–04

References

External links
 
 Kelafala Marah at Srbijafudbal
 Marah Profile at Azplayers

Living people
1984 births
Sierra Leonean footballers
Sierra Leone international footballers
Sierra Leonean expatriate footballers
Association football midfielders
FK Željezničar Sarajevo players
Expatriate footballers in Bosnia and Herzegovina
FK Čukarički players
First League of Serbia and Montenegro players
Expatriate footballers in Serbia
Expatriate footballers in Serbia and Montenegro
Expatriate footballers in Sweden
Sierra Leonean expatriate sportspeople in Sweden